This is a set of lists of the oldest Test and first-class cricketers.

Oldest living Test cricketers

Oldest living Test cricketers by country

Note: Twenty-seven first-class cricketers are known to have attained centenarian status (see relevant section below). 
 
Source:

Oldest Test cricketers still playing at Test level

Oldest Test cricketers still playing at Test level, by country

Note: The above lists include players who have played Test cricket within the past 24 months and have not formally announced their retirement.

Longest-lived Test cricketers

See also Oldest living Test cricketers above.

 
Source:

Oldest Test debutants

Oldest Test debutant by country

Note:  The oldest debutant, James Southerton, was also the first Test cricketer to die (on 16 June 1880). Miran Bakhsh was known as Miran Bux during his playing career.

Source:

Oldest Test cricketers on final appearance

Oldest Test cricketers on final appearance by country

Note:  The Test career of Wilfred Rhodes spanned a record 30 years, 315 days. England's youngest Test cricketer and another Yorkshireman, Brian Close (born 24 February 1931), lies second in this regard. He made his debut against New Zealand in 1949 and was recalled, after an absence of almost nine years, to oppose West Indies in 1976 (his career lasting 26 years, 356 days).
 
Source:

Longest-lived first-class cricketers

This list includes all those first-class players who are known to have lived to 100.

Note: Although born in New South Wales, Australia, Syd Ward and John Wheatley appear to have been raised in New Zealand. George Harman, who acquired two Rugby Union caps for Ireland, died in Cornwall. Charles Braithwaite was born in England. Fred Gibson moved to England in 1944. Neil McCorkell was born in England, but lived in South Africa from 1951. The prominent Antiguan cricketer, Sir Sydney Walling, who died aged 102 years, 88 days in October 2009, never appeared in matches accorded first-class status.

The oldest person, and only septuagenarian, to play first-class cricket was Raja Maharaj Singh, aged 72, his sole appearance being for the Bombay Governor's XI against a Commonwealth XI in November 1950. Thirteen players have played first-class cricket in their sixties, most of them in England in the 19th century.

Oldest women cricketers
England women's cricketer Eileen Whelan (later Eileen Ash), born 30 October 1911, was the first female Test cricketer to attain centenarian status; she died on 3 December 2021, aged 110 years 34 days.

Oldest living ODI cricketers
The first One-Day International took place on 5 January 1971 when Australia played England.

Oldest living Twenty20 International cricketers

The first Twenty20 International took place on 17 February 2005 when Australia played New Zealand. The oldest living T20I cricketers are:

 Osman Göker of Turkey, currently aged 
 Cengiz Akyüz of Turkey, currently aged 
 Serdar Kansoy of Turkey, currently aged 
 Christian Rocca of Gibraltar, currently aged 
 Hasan Alta of Turkey, currently aged 
 James Moses of Botswana, currently aged 
 Mark Oman of Slovenia, currently aged 
 Sunil Dhaniram of Canada, currently aged 
 Tony Whiteman of Luxembourg, currently aged 
 Sanath Jayasuriya of Sri Lanka, currently aged

References

Oldest
Lists of oldest people